Peterson Hills is a group of hills just east of Spear Glacier, between the Hauberg and Wilkins Mountains, in Palmer Land. Mapped by United States Geological Survey (USGS) from surveys and U.S. Navy air photos, 1961–67. Named by Advisory Committee on Antarctic Names (US-ACAN) for D.G. Peterson, electronics technician at South Pole Station in 1963.

Hills of Palmer Land